NAPCO (Northwestern Auto Parts Company) was a four-wheel drive automobile parts manufacturing company founded in 1918.

It was based in Minneapolis, Minnesota, in the United States.

History

1940s
During World War II, NAPCO helped the war effort by producing specialized mechanical parts and assemblies that were tested in war conditions.

As early as 1942 NAPCO began building four-wheel drive assemblies to be fitted to Ford, GMC, Chevrolet and Studebaker vehicles however NAPCO is primarily associated with GMC and Chevrolet pickups. From 1942 to 1956 4×4 GMC and Chevrolet trucks could be ordered by the government and civilians with a NAPCO Power-Pak kit and the kit could be installed later. The retail price of Napco Power-Pak was $995. This option raised the price on a new two-wheel drive truck from $1,548.96 to $2,796.96. The kit was shipped in a crate measuring 80"x30"x26" weighing 1,410 pounds. In a matter of 3 hours with as little as 4 holes drilled in existing chassis a truck would be converted into a "Mountain Goat", a "full sized truck that will climb steep inclines with ease". One feature was the "shift on the fly" rubber mounted transfer case with a dual-range option.

There were companies that installed these upgrades for the previously mentioned manufacturers. Besides the four-wheel drive units NAPCO also provided winches, auxiliary transmissions, tandem drive axles, hydrovac systems, and dump truck bodies.

1950s

From 1956 to 1959 the NAPCO Power-Pak option could be ordered directly from GM (an official RPO 690 was assigned in 1957) and factory installed on trucks with very few modifications to the original chassis. The 1955 4×4 NAPCO GMC or Chevrolet was a $1250.00 to $1550.00 optional add on. The 1957 Chevrolet and GMC 3100 4×4 price was a bargain at $2549.00 compared to the earlier add on kits. In 1960 NAPCO and GM parted ways when GM redesigned the front suspension on their 1960 pickup line so that it wasn't easily compatible with the existing Power-Pak kits.

Prior to 1955 NAPCO Power-Pak conversions were done on 3/4 and one ton GMC and Chevrolet chassis. The Pre-1955 ton chassis used an incompatible "torque tube" drive. In the fall of 1954 GMC and Chevrolet changed the 1955 ton pickup and Suburban models to the compatible Hotchkiss drive.
Today these trucks are still considered to be very versatile and durable 60 years later and are considered to be collectible by NAPCO enthusiasts.

Napco also produced a front wheel assist for Ford 600 and 800 series tractors in the mid 1950's in a partnership with Sherman. The kit was marketed under the name Sherman Napco. The Sherman Napco front wheel assist kit did not sell in large numbers and competed with the Elenco front wheel assist.

Other early 4×4 manufacturers 
Early factory 4×4 pickup manufacturers and early 4×4 conversion kit manufacturers include:
Marmon-Herrington in Indianapolis. Marmon-Herrington is commonly associated with equipping 1940s and 1950s Ford pickup trucks with 4 wheel drive.
Willys Overland along with Ford built the Willys MB Jeep working from designs by the American Bantam Car Company. After W.W.II Willys-Overland built the CJ series, and Willys Wagons among other early 4x4 vehicles.
Chrysler Motor Corporation's Dodge Trucks World War II Power Wagon.

See also

References 

Auto parts suppliers of the United States
Automotive transmission makers
Four-wheel drive layout
Off-road vehicles
Manufacturing companies based in Minneapolis
Manufacturing companies established in 1918
1918 establishments in Minnesota
Defunct companies based in Minnesota
American companies established in 1918